Georges Gatier (17 March 1893 – 11 July 1955) was a French racing cyclist. He rode in the 1924 Tour de France.

References

1893 births
1955 deaths
French male cyclists
Place of birth missing